XERA is a radio station in Mexico, broadcasting on 760 AM in San Cristóbal de las Casas, Chiapas. The callsign was most famous for its use on a border blaster at Villa Acuña, Coahuila.

XERA also broadcasts on FM at 101.5 MHz. It is not licensed for this frequency; the only FM station on the frequency in Chiapas is XHDB-FM in Tonalá.

The border blaster
From 1935 to 1939, XERA was the call sign of a border blaster licensed to Ramón D. Bósquez Vitela in September 1935 to Compañía Mexicana Radiodifusora Fronteriza in Villa Acuña, Coahuila. This station was the successor to XER which had been situated at the same location but whose transmitter had been dismantled after the station ceased broadcasting in February 1933. Like XER, it was under the control of John R. Brinkley of the U.S. state of Kansas. XERA ceased transmissions in 1939. After losing control of XER when it was shut down by the Mexican government in 1933, Brinkley dismantled the original XER transmitter but attempted to get a new concession for Villa Acuña. Months later in September 1935 he was granted a new concession via his partnership of Cía Mexicana Radiodifusora Fronteriza, a company which was represented by Bósquez as the owner; this was officially awarded on November 18 of that year. The original station broadcast on 960 kHz.

Brinkley used the old buildings of XER but installed a new 500 kilowatt transmitter with help from two Texas radio engineers. The antenna for XER had been omnidirectional, but the new directional antenna of XERA allowed Brinkley to claim that his station had an effective radiated power of one megawatt. One of his Texas engineers called XERA "the world's most powerful broadcasting station," which was a slogan that he would use again in the 1960s for two more of his engineering endeavors: the United States military transmitters which communicated with the U.S. submarine fleet, and again for the offshore pirate station Swinging Radio England.

Following the signing of various international treaties with the United States, the Mexican government forced XERA off the air in the closing days of 1939, by which time it had moved to 800 kHz. The station's programming, featuring quack doctor religious cures and Nazi propaganda, and the station's reputation for breaking laws and evading taxes, put the station in the sights of both Mexican and American authorities. On June 16, 1941, the Official Journal of the Federation ran a decree expropriating the station, also noting that "the Federal Government has an urgent need to obtain a radio station as powerful as XERA to dedicate it to the service of the Federation ... and that it is currently not possible to obtain it from the United States of America, given the conditions that dominate in Europe". Again the equipment was removed and the location would not become the site of another, unrelated border blaster until years later following World War II in 1947. See the history of XERF for details.

In San Cristóbal de las Casas
On November 3, 1973, a new XERA-AM took to the air in San Cristóbal de las Casas, owned by the government of the state of Chiapas and the state's first public radio station.

From 1985 to 1990, this station was operated by the Instituto Mexicano de la Radio under a co-operation agreement that saw IMER launch two radio stations in the state. When the government of Chiapas opted to retake control of XERA, IMER built a replacement station, XECHZ-AM Chiapa del Corzo.

Programming on XERA-AM is broadcast in various languages including Tzeltal and Tzotzil.

External links
"Wolfman Jack's old station howling once again," Dallas Times Herald, January 2, 1983. - primarily about XERF-AM but it also includes background information on the border-blasters.
Border Radio by Fowler, Gene and Crawford, Bill. Texas Monthly Press, Austin. 1987 
Mass Media Moments in the United Kingdom, the USSR and the USA, by Gilder, Eric. - "Lucian Blaga" University of Sibiu Press, Romania. 2003

References

Radio stations in Chiapas
San Cristóbal de las Casas
Public radio in Mexico